A question may be either a linguistic expression used to make a request for information, or the request itself.

Question(s), The Question(s) or A Question may also refer to:

Literature 
 Question (character) or The Question, one of several DC Comics superheroes
 Renee Montoya, The Question, heir to the original character
 "Question" (short story), a 1955 story by Isaac Asimov 
 "A Question" (poem), a 1942 poem by Robert Frost
 La Question (The Question), a 1958 book by Henri Alleg
 Questions: Philosophy for Young People, a peer-reviewed scholarly journal
 The Question, a 1979 novel by Ghalib Halasa

Music

Albums
 Question (EP), by CLC, 2015
 A Question (album), by Sacred Reich, 1991
 La question (album), by Françoise Hardy, 1971, or the title track
 The Question (The Slackers album), 1998
 The Question (Emery album), 2005
 The Question, an EP by Eden xo, 2019
 Questions (album), by Paul Bley, 1985

Songs
 "Question" (Lloyd Price song), 1960
 "Question" (The Moody Blues song), 1970
 "Question!", by System of a Down, 2005
 "Question...?", by Taylor Swift, 2022
 "Question", by Old 97's from Satellite Rides, 2001
 "Question", by Stray Kids from I Am Who, 2018
 "Question", by Uriah Heep from Sonic Origami, 1998
 "La question", by Gaëtan Roussel from Trafic, 2018
 "The Question" (song), by Concept of One with Noel Pagan, 1990
 "Questions" (Chris Brown song), 2017
 "Questions" (Tamia song), 2004
 "Questions", by Buffalo Springfield from Last Time Around, 1968
 "Questions", by INXS from Welcome to Wherever You Are, 1992
 "Questions", by Jennifer Paige from Jennifer Paige, 1998
 "Questions", by Little Big Town from Nightfall, 2020
 "Questions", by Lost Frequencies, 2022
 "Questions", by Manfred Mann's Earth Band from The Roaring Silence, 1976
 "Questions", by Middle Kids from Today We're the Greatest, 2021
 "Questions", by Moneybagg Yo from Heartless, 2017
 "Questions", by Pop Smoke from Faith, 2021
 "Questions", by Tommy Emmanuel from Only, 2000

Performers
 The Questions, a Scottish pop band
 Question?, a Japanese group promoted by Johnny & Associates

Other uses
 an element in a questionnaire (primarily in social research)
 an element of an exam (in educational assessment)
 Ballot question, in a referendum
 National question, a political and diplomatic issue regarding the status of a territory
 Research question, a question that a research project sets out to answer
 Questioning (infinitive form: to question), another term for police interrogation
 Questions (game), a game played by asking questions
 Masá’il (مسائل) or "Questions", the fifteenth month of the Bahá'í calendar

See also
 Question mark (disambiguation)
 Answer (disambiguation)
 Questions and answers (disambiguation)
 Interrogative, for grammatical rules for question formation
 Inquiry
 Ask (disambiguation)